The following is a list of the largest European manufacturing companies, ordered by revenue in billions of US dollars, .

Largest European manufacturing companies by revenue

See also 
 List of largest manufacturing companies by revenue
 List of largest European companies by revenue
 List of European financial services companies by revenue
 List of largest companies by revenue
 List of public corporations by market capitalization
 List of largest corporate profits and losses
 Fortune Global 500
 List of wealthiest organizations

References
 forbes.com - global 2000
 CNN Money - Fortune Global 500

Manufacturing companies by revenue
Europe
Companies by revenue